Edwin Liu is the current president of Industrial Technology Research Institute (ITRI). He was previously the Senior Vice President of Smart Grid & Grid Management at Nexant, Inc. He also held various technical and management positions at Quanta Technology, Bechtel, PG&E, Siemens, and Control Data Corporation (CDC). Edwin Liu is an IEEE Fellow and once served as Chairman of its Computer and Analytical Methods Subcommittee.

Career 

 President of Industrial Technology Research Institute (ITRI), Taiwan (2018.04 to Present)
 Chairman, Industrial Technology Investment Corporation, Taiwan (2020.06 to Present)
 Senior Vice President, Nexant, United States (2014-2018)
 Vice President, Quanta Technology, United States (2008-2014)
 Senior Vice President/Vice President, Nexant, United States (2000-2008)
 Senior Manager, Bechtel R&D, United States (1997-2000)
 Supervisor, Pacific Gas and Electric Company, United States (1991-1997)
 Senior Engineer, Siemens and Control Data Corporation, United States (1987-1991)

Expertise 
Dr. Edwin Liu's expertise is on smart grid, information integration, power system optimization, electricity market modeling, energy and emission management, automation, and technology innovation. Besides being an energy domain expert, he has practical experience in big data analytics and artificial intelligence research as well as application development, along with a strong background in startups, R&D, and business strategy.

Honors & Recognition 

 Fellow of the IEEE for contributions to the development of state estimation and optimal power flows, and their integration in utility systems (Awarded 2001)
 Outstanding Performance Awards for excellent innovations, Quanta Technology, USA (2010)
 Outstanding Awards for chairmanship of the IEEE Computing and Analytical Methods (2009)
 Outstanding Service Awards for planning, organizing, and management of the first IEEE PES Power System Conference and Exhibition, IEEE (2005)
 Technical Excellence and Contribution Awards for contributions to advanced optimization analytics and implementation on commercial products, Siemens‐Empros International (1990)
 Outstanding Awards for excellent R&D project, Pacific Gas and Electric Company, USA (1996)
 Small Business Innovation Research (SBIR) Award by National Science Foundation, USA (1993)

Professional Services 
Technical Societies

 Consultant of Board of Directors, The Allied Association for Science Park Industries, Taiwan (2020.08 to Present)
 Fellow of Chinese Society for Management of Technology (2020)
 GridWise Alliance and Smart Grid Implementation Working Group (2010-2013)
 Steering Committee of the IEEE Power System Conference and Exhibition (2004-2014)
 Chairman of the IEEE PES Computing and Analytical Methods Subcommittee (1998-2006)
 Co-Chairman of the IEEE PSACE Open Source Software Working Group (2007-2010)
 IEEE PES Intelligent Grid Coordinating Committee (2006-2010)
 IEEE PSACE Fellow Review Committee (2006-2010)
 IEEE Admission and Advancement Review Subcommittee (2005)
 Technical Committee of the IEEE Power Industry Computer Applications (1995-2001)

Academic and Government Agencies

 Committee Member, Consulting Platform of Policy Proposals for Sustainable Transition and Decarbonization Pathways, Academia Sinica, Taiwan (2021.04 to Present)
 Director, Railway Technology Research and Certification Center, Ministry of Transportation and Communications, Taiwan (2021.03 to Present)
 President, Taiwan Power and Energy Engineering Association, Taiwan (2020.11 to Present)
 Advisor, Circular Economy Promotion Office, Ministry of Economic Affairs, Taiwan (2020.09 to Present)
 Member of Experts on Overseas Compatriot Work, Overseas Community Affairs Council, Executive Yuan, Taiwan (2020.09 to Present)
 International Advisor at the National Energy Program Office, Taiwan (2015 to 2018)
 Energy Advisor at the Ministry of Economy, Taiwan (2016 to 2018)
 Industry Advisor, Smart Grid Laboratory, University of California, Los Angeles, USA (2010 to 2014)
 Industry Advisor, Board of Directors, at the Energy Systems Research Center, University of Texas, Arlington, USA (2004 to 2018)

References

External links 
 Dr. Edwin Liu Takes Office as ITRI’s President (ITRI Official Website)
 New ITRI president takes office (DIGITIMES)
 ITRI new president takes office (Focus Taiwan)
 Dr. Edwin Liu Takes Office as ITRI’s President (ITRI TODAY)
 #ITRI is pleased to announce that Dr. Edwin Liu has been appointed President of ITRI (Facebook)
 #ITRI is pleased to announce that Dr. Edwin Liu has been appointed President of ITRI (Twitter)
 #ITRI is pleased to announce that Dr. Edwin Liu has been appointed President of ITRI. (Instagram)

Taiwanese engineers
Taiwanese business executives
Fellow Members of the IEEE
National Taiwan University alumni
University of California, Berkeley alumni
Living people
Year of birth missing (living people)
Taiwanese expatriates in the United States
20th-century Taiwanese businesspeople
21st-century Taiwanese businesspeople